Little Texas is the fourth studio album released in 1997 by the country music group Little Texas. It was their last album for Warner Bros. Records. "Bad for Us", "Your Mama Won't Let Me" and "The Call" were all released from this album, peaking at numbers 45, 64 and 71, respectively, on the Billboard country charts, making this the first album of Little Texas' career not to produce any Top 40 country hits.

This is also the only album to feature Jeff Huskins on keyboards; Huskins replaced former keyboardist/co-lead vocalist Brady Seals, who had departed for a solo career in late 1994. In addition, it is the last album to feature lead vocalist Tim Rushlow. After Little Texas disbanded at the end of 1997, Rushlow departed for a solo career; Gray, Howell, O'Brien, and Propes re-established the band seven years later, with Steven Troy briefly serving as lead vocalist.

Track listing
"Loud and Proud" (Porter Howell, Sam Gay) - 3:31
"Bad for Us" (Howell, Dwayne O'Brien, Tom Shapiro) - 3:14
"Ain't No Time to Be Afraid" (Howell, Allen Shamblin) - 4:00
"Long Way Down" (Bob DiPiero, Howell, O'Brien) - 2:54
"Your Mama Won't Let Me" (Del Gray, Thom McHugh, Keith Follesé) - 3:00
"All in the Line of Love" (Howell, O'Brien, Stephen Allen Davis) - 3:35
"Living in a Bullseye" (Walt Aldridge, DiPiero) - 3:10
"The Call" (Aldridge, Tim Rushlow) - 4:22
"Yesterday's Gone Forever" (O'Brien, Jim Rushing) - 3:23
"If I Don't Get Enough of You" (Howell, Chuck Jones) - 3:00

Personnel

Little Texas
Del Gray – drums
Porter Howell – acoustic guitar, electric guitar, slide guitar, 6-string bass guitar
Jeff Huskins – keyboards, synthesizer, fiddle, mandolin, piano, background vocals
Dwayne O'Brien – acoustic guitar, lead vocals, background vocals
Duane Propes – bass guitar, background vocals
Tim Rushlow – lead vocals, background vocals

Additional musicians
Dan Dugmore – pedal steel guitar
Sonny Garrish – pedal steel guitar

Chart performance

1997 albums
Little Texas (band) albums
Warner Records albums
Albums produced by James Stroud